Robert Lansing (February 2, 1799 – October 3, 1878) was an American lawyer and politician from New York.

Early life
He was the son of Judge Sanders Gerritse Lansing (1766–1850) and Catherine (née Ten Eyck) Lansing (1769–1850). Chancellor John Lansing, Jr. and State Treasurer Abraham G. Lansing were his uncles; Congressman Gerrit Y. Lansing was his first cousin; and Congressman Frederick Lansing was his nephew. His maternal grandparents were Abraham Ten Eyck and Annatje (née Lansing) Ten Eyck.

He attended Union College but did not graduate.

Career
In 1817, he removed to Watertown, studied law there with Egbert Ten Eyck, and was admitted to the bar in 1820. He was District Attorney of Jefferson County from 1826 to 1833, when he was succeeded by George C. Sherman (the father-in-law of his nephew Frederick Lansing).

He was a member of the New York State Senate (4th D.) from 1832 to 1835, sitting in the 55th, 56th, 57th and 58th New York State Legislatures. Afterwards he practiced law in partnership with George C. Sherman, who was then his brother-in-law.

He was again District Attorney of Jefferson County from 1845 to 1846; First Judge of the Jefferson County Court from 1847 to 1851; Supervisor of the Town of Watertown in 1852; and again a member of the State Senate (21st D.) in 1854 and 1855.

Personal life
On December 22, 1831, he married Maria Hubbard (1802–1839), the eldest daughter of Noadiah Hubbard and Eunice (née Ward) Hubbard. Together, they were the parents of several children, only one of whom lived to maturity:

 John Lansing (1832–1907), the father of U.S. Secretary of State Robert Lansing.

On February 2, 1841, Lansing married Cornelia Hubbard (1804–1885), a younger sister of his first wife. Together, they were parents of:

 Cornelia M. Lansing (1843–1926)

Lansing died on October 3, 1878. He was buried at the Brookside Cemetery in Watertown.

References

Sources
Lansing genealogy at RootsWeb

External links

1799 births
1878 deaths
Politicians from Albany, New York
Politicians from Watertown, New York
Democratic Party New York (state) state senators
New York (state) Jacksonians
19th-century American politicians
Town supervisors in New York (state)
Union College (New York) alumni
County district attorneys in New York (state)
New York (state) state court judges
Lawyers from Albany, New York
Lansing family
Ten Eyck family